Massimo Monti (born 26 March 1962 in Bologna) is an Italian racing driver who competed from 1985 to 2014.

References

1962 births
Sportspeople from Bologna
Living people
Italian racing drivers
International Formula 3000 drivers
24 Hours of Le Mans drivers
British Formula 3000 Championship drivers
20th-century Italian people